Bandipora Assembly constituency is one of the 87 constituencies in the Jammu and Kashmir Legislative Assembly of Jammu and Kashmir a north state of India. Bandipora is also part of Baramulla Lok Sabha constituency.

Member of Legislative Assembly
 1967: M. A. Khan, Indian National Congress
 1972: M. A. Khan, Indian National Congress
 1977: Mohammad Khalil, Jammu & Kashmir National Conference
 1983: Mohammad Khalil, Jammu & Kashmir National Conference
 1987: Ghulam Rosool Mir, Jammu & Kashmir National Conference
 1996: Ghulam Rosool Mir, Jammu & Kashmir National Conference
 2002: Usman Abdul Majid, Jammu & Kashmir National Conference
 2008: Nizamuddin Bhat, Jammu & Kashmir People's Democratic Party

Election results

2014

See also

 Bandipora
 Bandipora district
 List of constituencies of Jammu and Kashmir Legislative Assembly

References

Assembly constituencies of Jammu and Kashmir
Bandipora district